Below follows a list of notables from the city of Limón, Costa Rica.

Activism 

 Jairo Mora (1987–2013), environmentalist.

Business 

 Walter Kissling (1931–2002).

Film and television 

 Harry Shum Jr. (b. 1982), actor (Glee).

Literature 

 Joaquín Gutiérrez (1918–2000), writer.

Politics 

 Maureen Clarke (b. 1952), deputy for the National Liberation Party (2014–2018).

Sports

American and Canadian football 

 Donald De La Haye (b. 1996), placekicker (Toronto Argonauts) and YouTube personality

Boxing 

 Carl Davis (b. 1970), heavyweight boxer.

Football 

 Kurt Bernard (b. 1977), retired striker.
 Juan Cayasso (b. 1961), retired striker.
 Henry Cooper (b. 1989), striker (Golfito).
 Víctor Coto (b. 1990), striker.
 Enrique Díaz (b. 1959), retired midfielder.
 Gerald Drummond (b. 1976), retired striker.
 Jervis Drummond (b. 1976), retired defender.
 Waylon Francis (b. 1990), defender (Columbus Crew).
 Julio Fuller (1956–2019), defender.
 Andy Furtado (b. 1980), striker.
 Mayron George (b. 1993), striker (Budapest Honvéd).
 Donny Grant (b. 1976), retired goalkeeper.
 Denis Hamlett (b. 1969), retired defender.
 Andy Herron (b. 1978), retired striker.
 César Hines (b. 1958), retired defender.
 Derrick Johnson (b. 1989), defender (Barrio México).
 Rodrigo Kenton (b. 1955), coach.
 Leroy Lewis (b. 1945), coach.
 Dennis Marshall (1985–2011), defender.
 Rodolfo Mills (b. 1958), retired defender.
 Fernando Montero (b. 1948), retired striker.
 Kraesher Mooke (b. 1984), retired midfielder.
 Roy Myrie (b. 1982), defender.
 Edder Nelson (b. 1986), midfielder (La U Universitarios).
 Reynaldo Parks (b. 1974), retired defender.
 Winston Parks (b. 1981), retired striker.
 Patrick Pemberton (b. 1982), goalkeeper (San Carlos).
 Allard Plummer (b. 1949), retired striker.
 Enrique Rivers (b. 1961), retired midfielder.
 Erick Scott (b. 1981), retired striker.
 Richard Smith (b. 1967), retired midfielder.
 Roy Smith (b. 1990), defender (Limón).
 Yeltsin Tejeda (b. 1992), midfielder (Herediano).
 Carlos Toppings (1953–2007), defender.
 Johan Venegas (b. 1988), midfielder (Saprissa).
 Vicente Wanchope (b. 1946), retired striker.
 Carlos Watson (b. 1951), coach.
 Whayne Wilson (1975–2005), striker.
 Josue Monge

Track and field 

 Nery Brenes (b. 1985), sprinter.
 Sherman Guity (b. 1996), Paralympic sprinter.
 Sharolyn Scott (b. 1983), hurdler.
People from Limón Province
Limón